Three ships of the United States Navy have been named USS Denver, after the city of Denver, Colorado.

  was a cruiser commissioned in 1904 and in service until 1931.
  was a light cruiser commissioned 1942 and on active service in World War II, and decommissioned in 1947.
  was an amphibious transport dock commissioned in 1968 and decommissioned in 2014.

United States Navy ship names